Acanthaster is a bitypic genus of large and venomous starfish placed in its own family, Acanthasteridae.  Its two members are known as crown-of-thorns starfish. Acanthaster are native to coral reefs in Indo-Pacific region.

The species in this genus are a contributor to coral reef degradation because they prey on a large amount of live coral at high density.

Species
These species are listed in the World Register of Marine Species:
Acanthaster brevispinus Fisher, 1917
Acanthaster planci (Linnaeus, 1758)

Some sources add Acanthaster ellisi, (Gray, 1840) but it is now considered as a subspecies of A. planci in the eastern Pacific.

Recent molecular work has suggested that Acanthaster planci is a species complex of up to 4 different species that have yet to be separately described (Vogler et al., 2008).

Haszprunar, Vogler & Wörheide (2017) suggest to split "A. planci" in : 
 Acanthaster planci (Linnaeus, 1758) -- Northern Indian Ocean, always purple-blue and red
 Acanthaster mauritiensis de Loriol, 1885 -- Souther Indian Ocean
 Acanthaster solaris (Schreber, 1795) -- Pacific Ocean (max. 23 arms)
 Acanthaster benziei Wörheide, Kaltenbacher, Cowan & Haszprunar, 2022 --  Red Sea (max. 14 arms).

References

Acanthasteridae